Irène Dimwaogdo Tiendrébéogo (born 27 February 1977) is a Burkinabé-Monegasque retired female athlete who specialised in high jump. Tiéndrebeogo competed at the 1995, 1997 and 1999 World Championships in Athletics in the Women's high jump. She also competed at the 1996 Summer Olympics in Atlanta.

Competition record

References

External links

1977 births
Living people
Sportspeople from Ouagadougou
Burkinabé high jumpers
Female high jumpers
Burkinabé female athletes
Olympic athletes of Burkina Faso
Athletes (track and field) at the 1996 Summer Olympics
World Athletics Championships athletes for Burkina Faso
African Games silver medalists for Burkina Faso
African Games medalists in athletics (track and field)
Burkinabé emigrants to Monaco
Monegasque female sprinters
Athletes (track and field) at the 1995 All-Africa Games
Athletes (track and field) at the 1999 All-Africa Games
21st-century Burkinabé people